Salvador Castro is the name of:
Salvador Castaneda Castro (1888–1965), former President of El Salvador
Sal Castro (1933–2013), American educator and activist